The American Journal of Human Biology is a peer-reviewed scientific journal covering human biology. It is the official publication of the Human Biology Association (formerly known as the Human Biology Council). The journal publishes original research, theoretical articles, reviews, and other communications connected to all aspects of human biology, health and disease.

According to the Journal Citation Reports, the journal has a 2020 impact factor of 1.937, ranking it 32nd out of 93 journals in the category "Anthropology" and 55th out of 93 journals in the category "Biology".

References

External links 
 
 Human Biology Association

Publications established in 1989
Anthropology journals
Human biology journals
Wiley-Liss academic journals
English-language journals
Bimonthly journals
Biology journals